Chuck Workman is a documentary filmmaker from Philadelphia, Pennsylvania, USA. His 1986 film Precious Images won an Academy Award for Best Live Action Short Film; his work has also been nominated for Emmy Awards, Sundance Film Festival awards, and the Taos Talking Film Festival awards.

Workman frequently creates the montages seen on the televised Academy Awards shows, including the in memoriam segment. He is sometimes credited as Carl Workman.  He is the father of filmmaker Jeremy Workman.

Select filmography
 1986: Precious Images (2009 National Film Registry inductee)
 1986: Stoogemania
 1987: Words 1989: 50 Years of Bugs Bunny in 3½ Minutes 1994: 100 Years at the Movies 1999: The Source 2003: A House on a Hill 2010: Visionaries 2013: What Is Cinema? 2014: Magician: The Astonishing Life and Work of Orson Welles''

References

External links

Workman's official Vimeo channel
King of Condensed Films: Meet Chuck Workman, The Oscars' Montage Master-NPR article

Collage filmmakers
American documentary filmmakers
American film editors
Directors of Live Action Short Film Academy Award winners
Living people
Artists from Philadelphia
Year of birth missing (living people)